Louis Del Grande (born March 23, 1943) is a Canadian-American television writer and actor. He is best known for starring in the Canadian mystery/comedy series Seeing Things.

Early life
Del Grande was born and raised in Union City, New Jersey. By the late-1980s, he moved to Cape Breton Island.

Career
Del Grande moved to Toronto in 1964, drawn to Canada by the Stratford Festival, and soon found work as a stand-up comedian and comedy writer. In 1975, he was hired as head writer for a new sitcom, The King of Kensington, which became a hit in Canada until the end of the decade. He also appeared in the show a handful of times as Fred, a friend of Al Waxman's lead character Larry King. Del Grande later became (with Jack Humphries) the show's co-producer (a Fifth Estate documentary said the two producers ran Kensington "with an iron hand").

When asked by the CBC if he had any projects he could star in, Del Grande created, wrote and produced Seeing Things, which aired from 1981 to 1987. Del Grande played a crime-solving clairvoyant tabloid reporter who was separated from his wife Marge (played by Del Grande's real-life wife, actress Martha Gibson). The series was popular and won Del Grande four Gemini Awards, two for best actor in a comedy and two for the show itself.

Outside Canada, Del Grande is probably best known as the ConSec scanner in the infamous "head explosion" scene in the David Cronenberg movie Scanners. He has also appeared in numerous theatrical and television movies and series, including Monkeys in the Attic, Due South, The Outer Limits and Goosebumps.

Filmography

Film

Television

References

External links
 

1943 births
Living people
Canadian male television actors
Canadian male film actors
Canadian male screenwriters
American emigrants to Canada
Place of birth missing (living people)
People from Union City, New Jersey
Best Actor in a Comedy Series Canadian Screen Award winners
20th-century Canadian screenwriters
20th-century Canadian male writers
21st-century Canadian screenwriters
21st-century Canadian male writers